Melinda Wenner Moyer is a science journalist and author based in the Hudson Valley, New York. She is a contributing editor at Scientific American and a columnist for Slate. Her book How To Raise Kids Who Aren't Assholes was published on July 20, 2021 by Putnam Books and was excerpted in The New York Times, The Atlantic, and Parents magazine.

Early life and education

Moyer graduated summa cum laude from St. Paul's School, Concord, New Hampshire in 1997.  At the University of Michigan she received a Bachelor of Science in molecular biology and a Bachelor of Music in composition. With a science education, she worked at a bio tech company in the UK before deciding to switch careers and become a science writer. In 2006 she received a master's degree in Science, Health and Environmental Reporting (SHERP) from New York University.

Career

Early in her career, she worked briefly as an editor, and then became a freelance journalist. Her early features were for institutional publications, particularly in Pitt Med, of the University of Pittsburgh School of Medicine. Clips from these writings were used to showcase her talent, and this opened the doors to more prestigious publications. She now avoids non-journalistic work entirely; without any clear guidelines, the possibility of conflicts of interest from working for institutional publications may lead to ethical situations difficult to navigate.

After a "fat pitch" to Slate, Moyer became a frequent contributor. She is now the science-based parenting columnist, and has written over 100 articles for Slate. In 2022, she began writing the Well newsletter for The New York Times. Other publications have included The Atlantic, Mother Jones, Nature, Discover, Popular Science, O: The Oprah magazine and, Self, among others.

In March, 2019(?), she became a visiting scholar at New York University. She had previously been an adjunct assistant professor of journalism at the CUNY Graduate School of Journalism. She was a 2018 Alicia Patterson Foundation Fellow. In 2020 she joined the faculty of New York University's Science, Health & Environmental Reporting Program. In 2017 an article she wrote for Scientific American was a finalist for a National Magazine Award.  

The Kavanaugh hearings for the U.S. Supreme Court led her to review and write about the long-term effects of sexual assault on teenagers.

Awards
Outstanding Opinion Article, American Society of Journalists and Authors, 2019, for "Anti-Vaccine Activists Have Taken Vaccine Science Hostage" in the New York Times
Excellence in Reporting, American Society of Journalists and Authors, 2018, for “Journey to Gunland," writing in Scientific American
June Roth Award for a Medical Article, American Society of Journalists and Authors, 2018, for  "Deserted,"published in Women’s Health
American Speech-Language-Hearing Association Media Award, 2017, for "You Eated Gogurt for Bekfast!" in Slate
Awards for Excellence in Health Care Reporting, 2017, for "The Looming Threat of Factory-Farm Superbugs" in Scientific American
 Folio Eddie award for best single article in Consumer: Science/Technology, 2017 for "The Looming Threat of Factory-Farm Superbugs"
American College of Emergency Physicians Journalism of Excellence Award, 2010, for "Cold Relief" in Popular Science

Personal life

She married science journalist and deputy editor of Quanta Magazine Michael Moyer in 2009. They have two children.

References

Year of birth missing (living people)
Living people
CUNY Graduate School of Journalism faculty
New York University alumni
Science writers
Scientific American people
St. Paul's School (New Hampshire) alumni
University of Michigan College of Literature, Science, and the Arts alumni
University of Michigan School of Music, Theatre & Dance alumni